John Julian (March 26, 1733) was a mixed-blood pirate who operated in the New World, as the pilot of the ship Whydah.

Julian joined pirate Samuel Bellamy, and became the pilot of Bellamy's Whydah when he was probably only 16 years of age.

In 1717, the Whydah shipwrecked, with Julian and a carpenter called Thomas Davis being the only known survivors. He was captured, but not indicted, so he was probably sold as a slave. He may have been the "Julian the Indian" bought by John Quincy, great grandfather of president John Quincy Adams.

"Julian the Indian" reportedly made multiple attempts to flee and once killed a bounty hunter who was after him. He was executed in March 1733.

Further reading
 W. Jeffrey Bolster - Black Jacks: African American Seamen in the Age of Sail.

References

1733 deaths
1701 births
18th-century pirates
Miskito people